Nikolai Aleksandrovich Panin-Kolomenkin (– 19 January 1956) was a Russian figure skater and coach. He won the gold medal in special figures in the 1908 Summer Olympics, became one of the oldest figure skating Olympic champions. Panin was Russia's first Olympic champion.

Life and career 
He competed in figure skating under the name "Nikolay Panin", though most Russian sources now hyphenate his surname to "Panin-Kolomenkin".

Despite having a weak constitution, Panin was very active and took part in rowing, cycling, athletics and gymnastics. While studying mathematics at Saint Petersburg University in 1897, he took part in a figure skating competition, albeit unsuccessfully. To improve, he developed a technique of wrapping towels around his feet to weigh them down and improve his balance, thus preventing falls. It was at this time that he took the nickname "Panin" on to evade the mockery of his fellow students, at a time when many athletes were adopting nicknames.

Two men's skating events were contested at the 1908 Summer Olympics: single skating and special figures. Panin won the special figures event and competed, but did not finish, in the singles event. 1908 was the only year in which special figures was an Olympic event. Panin also competed in the 1903 World Championships, placing second behind Salchow.

Panin was a prominent figure skating coach both before and after his win at the Olympics. He even helped train his rivals during his own competitive career. He wrote several biographical and reference books, the first of which appeared in 1910. He was also a judge at international competitions.

Panin also competed as a shooter. At the 1912 Summer Olympics in Stockholm he placed 8th in 50 metre pistol competition.

Panin was also one of the first to be ranked in a sport classification system, a precursor to the Unified Sports Classification System of the USSR. Several of his students also won ratings.

In 1993 Russia issued a 50 ruble gold coin commemorating Russia's first gold medal. Panin appears alongside the Olympic rings and flame, a laurel branch, and a winged ice skate. He was inducted into the World Figure Skating Hall of Fame in 2009.

Competitive highlights

Single skating

Special figures

See also
Image of more Panin special figures
Russia at the 1908 Summer Olympics

References

External links

 Nikolai Panin at databaseOlympics.com
 Figure skating academy named after Panin
  (figure skating)
  (shooting)

Navigation

1872 births
1956 deaths
People from Bobrovsky District
People from Bobrovsky Uyezd
Russian male single skaters
Olympic figure skaters of Russia
Figure skaters at the 1908 Summer Olympics
Russian male sport shooters
Olympic shooters of Russia
Shooters at the 1912 Summer Olympics
Olympic gold medalists for Russia
Saint Petersburg State University alumni
Olympic medalists in figure skating
World Figure Skating Championships medalists
European Figure Skating Championships medalists
Medalists at the 1908 Summer Olympics
Soviet figure skating coaches
Russian figure skating coaches
Burials at Serafimovskoe Cemetery
Sportspeople from Voronezh Oblast